Nibuwatar is a village development committee in Makwanpur District in the Narayani Zone of southern Nepal. At the time of the 1991 Nepal census, it had a population of 3,666.

Facilities
Nibuwatar is surrounded by hills and it lies between Bhinse and Bhimphedi.  There are more than 10 schools in Nibuwatar including one secondary school.  It is in Nibuwatar-9, kulekhani second and third hydro electricity offices are also in Nibuwatar.

Sport
Nibta club is a very famous sport club in Makawanpur.

References

Makwanpur District